Mount Saint Joseph may refer to:

Communities
 Mount Saint Joseph, Ohio, United States, an unincorporated community in central Delhi Township, Hamilton County

Educational institutions

Australia
 Mount Saint Joseph, Milperra, an independent Catholic girls school in Milperra, New South Wales
 Mount St. Joseph Girls' College, a Catholic girls school in Altona, Victoria

United Kingdom
 Mount St Joseph School, a secondary school in Farnworth, Greater Manchester, England

United States
 Chestnut Hill College, Philadelphia, Pennsylvania, founded as Mount Saint Joseph College and renamed in 1938
 Mount St. Joseph University, Cincinnati, Ohio, a private Catholic co-educational university
 Mount Saint Joseph High School, Baltimore, Maryland, a private Catholic high school

Hospitals
 Mount Saint Joseph Hospital, a public hospital in Vancouver, British Columbia, Canada

Religious places
 Mount Saint Joseph (West Virginia), a historic house and motherhouse located near Wheeling, Ohio County, West Virginia, United States, also known as Holloway Estate
 Mount St. Joseph Abbey, Roscrea, an abbey near Roscrea, North Tipperary, Ireland
 Mount Saint Joseph Cemetery (Hayward, California), United States, a cemetery also known as All Saints Cemetery or Portuguese Cemetery
 Mount St. Joseph (Peterborough, Ontario), Canada, a former Sisters of St. Joseph convent

See also
 Saint Joseph (disambiguation)
 Mount Saint Joseph Academy (disambiguation)